Dereviane may refer to the following places in Ukraine:

 Dereviane, village in Kamianets-Podilskyi Raion, Khmelnytskyi Oblast
 Dereviane, village in Rivne Raion, Rivne Oblast